Parichay may refer to:

 Parichay (film), a 1972 Indian film
 Parichay (singer), Indo-Canadian singer
"Parichay" (song), a 2019 song by Amit Bhadana 
 Parichay (TV series), a 2011–13 Indian television series
 Parichay Das, Indian writer
 Parichay Times, a Hindi daily newspaper

See also
 Paricha
 Parichah 
 Paricheh
 Parichha